The Old Vicarage in the Cambridgeshire village of Grantchester is a house associated with the poet Rupert Brooke, who lived nearby and in 1912 referenced it in an eponymous poem – The Old Vicarage, Grantchester.

The Old Vicarage was built in around 1685 on the site of an earlier building, and passed from church ownership into private hands in 1820.  It was bought in 1850 by Samuel Page Widnall (1825–1894), who extended it and established a printing business, the Widnall Press.

In 1910 it was owned by Henry and Florence Neeve, from whom Rupert Brooke rented a room, and later a large part of the house. Brooke's mother bought the house in 1916 and gave it to his friend, the economist Dudley Ward. In December 1979, it was bought by the novelist and former politician Jeffrey Archer and his wife, scientist Mary Archer. It has been listed Grade II on the National Heritage List for England since August 1962.

The Guardian crossword setter John Galbraith Graham (Araucaria) set a clue often described as epitomising his clue-making: Poetical scene with surprisingly chaste Lord Archer vegetating (3, 3, 8, 12), the last four words forming the anagram THE OLD VICARAGE GRANTCHESTER.

References

External links
 
 The Old Vicarage, Grantchester by Rupert Brooke

Further reading
Archer, Mary (1989) – Rupert Brooke and the Old Vicarage (Cambridge: Silent Books)
Archer, Mary (2012) – The Story of the Old Vicarage Grantchester (Cambridge: The Old Vicarage Press)

Clergy houses in England
Country houses in Cambridgeshire
Grade II listed houses
Grade II listed buildings in Cambridgeshire
Houses completed in 1685
Grantchester